Marco Antonio Parra Téllez (born January 22, 1985, in León, Guanajuato) is a Mexican footballer who plays for CF La Piedad (Third/Last tier of professional football competition).

Career
Parra emerged from the youth ranks of Chivas, and made his debut with the first team as an 18-year-old on October 22, 2003. He was acclaimed as a very promising prospect but failed to gain a place in Primera División de Mexico. Parra played only 14 games and scored thirteen goals in his three seasons with the club's first team.

External links
 

1985 births
Living people
Sportspeople from León, Guanajuato
Footballers from Guanajuato
Mexican footballers
Association footballers not categorized by position